Josef Oberhauser (born 23 February 1949) is an Austrian bobsledder who competed in the early 1970s. He won a bronze medal in the two-man event at the 1971 FIBT World Championships in Cervinia.

Oberhauser also finished eighth in the two-man event at the 1972 Winter Olympics in Sapporo.

References

External links
Bobsleigh two-man world championship medalists since 1931
Wallenchinsky, David (1984). "Bobsled: Two-man". In The Complete Book of the Winter Olympics: 1896 - 1980. New York: Penguin Books. p. 559.

1949 births
Living people
Austrian male bobsledders
Bobsledders at the 1972 Winter Olympics
Olympic bobsledders of Austria